Mitha Tiwana railway station is  located in  Pakistan.

See also
 List of railway stations in Pakistan
 Pakistan Railways
 Mitha Tiwana

References

External links

Railway stations in Punjab, Pakistan
Railway stations on Sangla Hill–Kundian Branch Line